Le Roy  is a city in Mower County, Minnesota, United States, surrounded by Le Roy Township.  The population was 929 at the 2010 census. Lake Louise State Park is just outside the town.

History
Le Roy was platted in 1867, when the railroad was extended to that point. The city was named after Le Roy, New York, the native home of a first settler.

Geography

Demographics

2010 census
As of the census of 2010, there were 929 people, 428 households, and 248 families living in the city. The racial makeup of the city was 99.2% White, 0.1% Native American, 0.1% Asian, 0.2% from other races, and 0.3% from two or more races. Hispanic or Latino of any race were 0.5% of the population.

There were 428 households, of which 25.9% had children under the age of 18 living with them, 46.3% were married couples living together, 7.9% had a female householder with no husband present, 3.7% had a male householder with no wife present, and 42.1% were non-families. 37.9% of all households were made up of individuals, and 18% had someone living alone who was 65 years of age or older. The average household size was 2.17 and the average family size was 2.86.

The median age in the city was 42.1 years. 23% of residents were under the age of 18; 6.9% were between the ages of 18 and 24; 23.3% were from 25 to 44; 27.7% were from 45 to 64; and 19.3% were 65 years of age or older. The gender makeup of the city was 48.7% male and 51.3% female.

2000 census
As of the census of 2000, there were 925 people, 411 households, and 249 families living in the city. The racial makeup of the city was 99.2% White, 0.1% African American, 0.2% Native American, 0.1% Asian, 0.1% Pacific Islander, and 0.2% from two or more races. Hispanic or Latino of any race were 1.0% of the population.

There were 411 households, out of which 24.8% had children under the age of 18 living with them, 49.6% were married couples living together, 7.1% had a female householder with no husband present, and 39.2% were non-families. 35.0% of all households were made up of individuals, and 19.7% had someone living alone who was 65 years of age or older.  The average household size was 2.24 and the average family size was 2.90.

In the city, the population was spread out, with 24.4% under the age of 18, 9.3% from 18 to 24, 25.9% from 25 to 44, 18.9% from 45 to 64, and 21.4% who were 65 years of age or older. The median age was 39 years. For every 100 females, there were 98.1 males.  For every 100 females age 18 and over, there were 93.6 males.

The median income for a household in the city was $34,286, and the median income for a family was $45,156. Males had a median income of $29,792 versus $18,125 for females. The per capita income for the city was $17,446. About 3.6% of families and 6.7% of the population were below the poverty line, including 7.1% of those under age 18 and 6.7% of those age 65 or over.

Library

The LeRoy Public Library is the public library in Le Roy.  It is a member of Southeastern Libraries Cooperating, the library region serving southeastern Minnesota.

Notable people
 Bob Mahoney, professional baseball player
 Harlan G. Palmer, newspaper publisher

References

Further reading

External links
 Lake Louise State Park website

Cities in Minnesota
Cities in Mower County, Minnesota